Ginny Creveling is the former executive director of the ONEOK foundation and a champion of numerous causes and organizations in Tulsa, Oklahoma, United States. She played a vital role in the creation of the Rainbow House in 1977, a child abuse prevention program and crisis nursery, the first of its kind, which paved the way for later organizations such as the  Child Abuse Network and the Parent Child Center. She has served as a community leader in race and ethnic relations with the Oklahoma Conference for Community and Justice. In 2007, Creveling was inducted into the Oklahoma Women's Hall of Fame for her volunteer and advocacy work.

Early life
Ginny Creveling was born in Manila, Philippines to Filipino parents. Her father was in the Filipino Army, and was commissioned on the battlefield into the U.S. Army, which at that time made him a U.S. citizen, making his wife and Creveling's mother also a legal U.S. citizen. All seven of their children also qualified for citizenship, and when they moved to the United States, most of Creveling's childhood was spent at numerous army bases. She was the oldest of seven children and had a large responsibility with the rearing of her younger siblings as a child, as her mother worked.

Creveling graduated from Lawton High School in 1964. College was highly encouraged by her parents, so Creveling attended the University of Oklahoma, where she entered a nursing program. A few years later, her mother fell ill, so she returned to California to care for her.

Soon after, Creveling was married and moved back to Oklahoma, where she had two children. When they were old enough to be in school, she re-entered a nursing program at the University of Tulsa, taking a class a semester. She earned her nursing degree in 1984, and later went back to school again and earned her MBA in 2000.

While Creveling was a stay-at-home mother, she was involved with numerous volunteer organizations, and one of these involvements led to a job.

Career
Through her volunteer efforts, Creveling was offered a position as PR director at the Westin Hotel, where she worked part-time for approximately eight years. The hotel eventually closed and Creveling was offered a position to head staffing for the  National Governors Association meeting held in Tulsa in 1993. After this event, she was offered a job from ONEOK. The company created a position for Creveling in community relations. When the ONEOK Foundation was established in 1997, she was there from the beginning as executive director.

Community involvement
Creveling played a vital role in the creation of Rainbow House, a child abuse prevention program and 24/7 crisis nursery that was the first of its kind. Eventually the program had to be closed due to loss of funding, but was merged with the Children's Registry at Hillcrest Medical Center, which then merged with Parents Anonymous, which is now the Parent Child Center. Her early advocacy work with child abuse led to a greater discourse in the community which paved the way for other programs to flourish in Tulsa.

Creveling has also played a large part in developing The Oklahoma Center for Community and Justice, a human relations organization dedicated to fighting bias, bigotry and racism and promoting respect and understanding through education and advocacy.

Other community groups which Creveling is involved include:
Association of Women in Communications
Funders Roundtable
Tulsa Press Club
Advisory council of Habitat for Humanity
Advisory council for Tulsa Young Professionals
Advisory council for the University of Oklahoma-Tulsa and University of Tulsa College of Business Administration
Board of Directors for the Oklahoma Jazz Hall of Fame
Former president and currently board of directors for the Child Abuse Network 
American Heart Association
Big Brothers & Sisters
Domestic Violence Intervention Services
Leadership Oklahoma and Leadership Tulsa
Sister Cities International
Tulsa Ballet Theater
Magic Empire Council of Girl Scouts

Awards and recognition
Oklahoma Women's Hall of Fame inductee (2007)
Juliette Low Leadership Award (2006)
Tulsan of the Year from Tulsa People magazine (2005)
Fifty Making a Difference by the Oklahoma Journal Record (2003 and 2005)

References

External links
Oklahoma Women's Hall of Fame Oral History Project -- OSU Library
 Child Abuse Network
 Parent Child Center

Year of birth missing (living people)
Living people
American people of Filipino descent
People from Tulsa, Oklahoma
People from Manila
University of Oklahoma alumni
University of Tulsa alumni